This is a list of lighthouses in the Fiji. Some places are in the West longitude.

Lighthouses

See also
 Lists of lighthouses and lightvessels

References

External links
 

Fiji
Lighthouses
Lighthouses